Qaleh Sangi (also Romanized as Qal‘eh Sangī and Qal‘eh-ye Sangī) is a village in Hana Rural District, in the Central District of Semirom County, Isfahan Province, Iran. At the 2006 census, its population was 35, in 9 families.

References 

Populated places in Semirom County